was a town located in Ibo District, Hyōgo Prefecture, Japan.

As of 2003, the town had an estimated population of 12,898 and a density of 545.14 persons per km². The total area was 23.66 km².

On October 1, 2005, Ibogawa, along with the towns of Mitsu and Shingū (all from Ibo District), was merged into the expanded city of Tatsuno. The town's name continues to be used as a part of addresses within the former town area.

Geography 
The Ibo River runs along the eastern edge of the town.

Adjoining municipalities 
Tatsuno (as formerly constituted), Aioi, Mitsu (also of Ibo District)

History 
 1951 April 1 – The town is established from the merger of the villages of Handa, Kanbe, Kōchi.
 1951 August 10 – A small part of the town belonging to the former village of Kanbe (the Nabano section) is transferred to Aioi.
 2003 April 18 – The city of Tatsuno and the towns of Shingū, Ibogawa, Mitsu, and Taishi form a merger council.
 2005 October 1 – Ibogawa merges with Tatsuno, Mitsu, and Shingū to form the new city of Tatsuno, with the hiragana form of "Tatsuno" (たつの) being used in the official name. The town of Ibogawa is abolished.

Leadership 
 Yagi Katsuyuki (八木　捷之), Ibogawa town mayor

Education 
Handa Elementary School
Kanbe Elementary School
Kōchi Elementary School
Ibogawa Junior High School

Media 
K-CAT eoTV (cable television)

Transportation

Rail 
The town is served by Tatsuno Station on JR West's San'yō Main Line.

The San'yō Shinkansen line passes through the center of town.

Bus 
Shinki Bus had service to Tatsuno.

Road 
San'yō Expressway
The nearest interchanges are Tatsuno IC and Tatsuno West IC, but both are located in the former area of the city of Tatsuno.
Japan National Route 2
Hyōgo Prefectural Route 5 Himeji-Kamigōri Route
Hyōgo Prefectural Route 440 Kuwahara Kitayama-Ibogawa Route
Hyōgo Prefectural Route 441 Nakashima-Ibogawa Route
Hyōgo Prefectural Route 442 Iwami-Ibogawa Route

Dissolved municipalities of Hyōgo Prefecture
Tatsuno, Hyōgo